The 2020/21 NTFL season was the 100th season of the Northern Territory Football League (NTFL).

The first game was played on Saturday, 2 October, and the Grand Final was played on Saturday, 20 March, with the Nightcliff Tigers winning the match by 7 points in a golden point thriller over St Marys. The Tigers claimed their sixth premiership title and even winning three premiership's in a row, this was the first team asides Saint Mary's to win three or more titles in a row since the Darwin Buffaloes 4 peat from 1967/68 to 1970/71.

Ladder

Ladder progression

Finals

Grand Final

References 

Northern Territory Football League seasons
NTFL